Charlie van Renen (23 August 1868 – 20 July 1942) was a South African international rugby union player. Born in Constantia, Cape Town, he attended Diocesan College before playing provincial rugby for Western Province. He made three appearances for South Africa, all against the British Isles, one match during the 1891 tour and two in 1896. Van Renen died in 1942, in Retreat, Cape Town, at the age of 73. His brother, Bertie, also played rugby union for South Africa.

References

South Africa international rugby union players
Rugby union forwards
1868 births
1942 deaths
Rugby union players from Cape Town
Alumni of Diocesan College, Cape Town
Western Province (rugby union) players